Emmanuel Ansong (born October 22, 1989, in Accra) is a Ghanaian footballer who plays as a defender for Hearts of Oak.

Career
Ansong began his career by Great Olympics and later he signed a contract with Heart of Lions, here was in the season 2008 named as captain.

International
Ansong was member of the 2005 Africa under 17 Championships and was member of the Ghana national under-17 football team at 2005 FIFA U-17 World Championship in Peru.

References

External links
 

1989 births
Living people
Heart of Lions F.C. players
Ghanaian footballers
Association football defenders
Accra Great Olympics F.C. players
Accra Hearts of Oak S.C. players
Footballers from Accra
2011 African Nations Championship players
Aduana Stars F.C. players
Ghana international footballers
Ghana youth international footballers
Ghana A' international footballers